Melee or mêlée is combat fought at close range, usually with lack of organization or cohesion. It may also refer to:

Hand-to-hand combat in general
Close combat
Melee (tournament), a form of "mixed" combat at medieval tournaments

Gaming
Melee (video games), the term for "close quarter combat" between video game characters
 Mêlée (engine), a game engine created by Toys for Bob for the Star Control computer game
 Melee (game), a board game by Metagaming Concepts
 Mêlée Island, a locale in the Monkey Island series, primarily in The Secret of Monkey Island (1990)
 Melee Pokémon Scramble, the translated Japanese name of Pokémon Rumble
 Super Smash Bros. Melee, a platform fighting game released for the Nintendo GameCube in 2001

Music
 Melee (Gizmachi album)
 Melee (Dogleg album)
 Mêlée (band), an alternative rock band
 Mêlée (EP), a 2002 EP by Mêlée
 "Melee" (song), a 2019 song by Tory Lanez

Other uses
 Robert Melee (born 1966), American artist
 Melee (comics), the code name of a fictional Marvel comic book character
Melée, small cut gem diamonds

See also
Melee weapon